The thrombin time (TT), also known as the thrombin clotting time (TCT), is a blood test that measures the time it takes for a clot to form in the plasma of a blood sample containing anticoagulant, after an excess of thrombin has been added. It is used to diagnose blood coagulation disorders and to assess the effectiveness of fibrinolytic therapy.  This test is repeated with pooled plasma from normal patients. The difference in time between the test and the 'normal' indicates an abnormality in the conversion of fibrinogen (a soluble protein) to fibrin, an insoluble protein.

The thrombin time compares the rate of clot formation to that of a sample of normal pooled plasma. Thrombin is added to the samples of plasma. If the time it takes for the plasma to clot is prolonged, a quantitative (fibrinogen deficiency) or qualitative (dysfunctional fibrinogen) defect is present. In  blood samples containing heparin, a substance derived from snake venom called batroxobin (formerly reptilase) is used instead of thrombin. Batroxobin has a similar action to thrombin but unlike thrombin it is not inhibited by heparin.

Normal values for thrombin time are 12 to 14 seconds. If batroxobin is used, the time should be between 15 and 20 seconds. Thrombin time can be prolonged by heparin, fibrin degradation products, and fibrinogen deficiency or abnormality.

Test procedure
After separating the plasma from the whole blood by centrifugation, bovine thrombin is added to the sample of plasma. Clot formation is detected optically or mechanically by a coagulation instrument. The time between the addition of the thrombin and the clot formation is recorded as the thrombin clotting time.

Specimen requirements
Whole blood is taken with either citrate or oxalate additive (if using the vacutainer system, this is a light blue top tube).  As with other coagulation assays, the tube must not be over- or under-filled in order to ensure the correct anticoagulant-to-blood ratio: one part anticoagulant per nine parts blood.

Reference ranges
The reference ranges of the thrombin clotting time is generally <22 seconds, and from 14 to 16 seconds. Laboratories usually calculate their own ranges, based on the method used and the results obtained from healthy individuals from the local population. Separate ranges are used for infants.

Limitations
Blood samples that are more than eight hours old can give inaccurate results when tested.

See also
 Coagulation cascade
 Partial thromboplastin time (PTT), or activated partial thromboplastin time (aPTT or APTT)
 Prothrombin time (PT)

References

External links

 http://www.fpnotebook.com/hemeonc/lab/ThrmbnTm.htm

Blood tests